Estádio Boca do Lobo is a stadium in Pelotas, Brazil. It has a capacity of 18,000 spectators.  It is the home of Esporte Clube Pelotas.

References

Football venues in Rio Grande do Sul